Meranoplus bicolor, is a species of ant of the subfamily Myrmicinae. It is found in many Asian countries, where its habitats range from open grasslands to open-canopy forests. They nest in soil, usually at the base of plants. The nest opening is a simple hole, but it can sometimes have multiple openings. Workers forage on the ground as well as on plants, where they exploit extrafloral nectaries and tend to aphids.

In 2021, Filipino–Canadian antkeeper, singer and comedian Mikey Bustos discovered that the ant lives in the Philippines. He shared his findings on his YouTube channel AntsCanada in this video.

Distribution
Meranoplus bicolor is native to Pakistan, India, Nepal, Bangladesh, Bhutan, Tibet, southern China, Taiwan, Myanmar, Thailand, Laos, Vietnam, Malaysia, Sumatra, Java, Sri Lanka, and possibly the Philippines. It has been found in Borneo, New Zealand, Louisiana, and Canada.

Subspecies
 Meranoplus bicolor bicolor (Guérin-Méneville, 1844)    
 Meranoplus bicolor fuscescens Wheeler, 1930     
 Meranoplus bicolor lucidus Forel, 1903

References

External links

 at antwiki.org
Animaldiversity.org
Itis.org

Myrmicinae
Hymenoptera of Asia
Insects described in 1844